Ruský Hrabovec is a village and municipality in the Sobrance District in the Košice Region of east Slovakia.

History

In historical records the village was first mentioned in 1567.

Geography

The village lies at an altitude of 280 metres and covers an area of 16.819 km².
It has a population of 370 people.

Facilities

The village has a public library, and a football pitch.

External links
http://en.e-obce.sk/obec/ruskyhrabovec/rusky-hrabovec.html
http://www.statistics.sk/mosmis/eng/run.html

Villages and municipalities in Sobrance District